John V. "Studs" Bancker (1853 - October 7, 1888) was an American professional baseball player. He played in 19 games in Major League Baseball, principally as a catcher, for New Haven Elm Citys between April 19 and June 5, 1875.

Early years
Bancker was born in Philadelphia in 1853. He was the son of a Civil War veteran.

Professional baseball
Bancker played in 19 games in Major League Baseball, 14 as catcher and nine at various infield positions, for 1875 New Haven Elm Citys of the National Association of Professional Base Ball Players.  His first major league game was on April 19, 1875, and his last was on June 5, 1875. He compiled a .153 batting average in 72 at bats.

In addition to his six weeks in the major leagues, Bancker played for the Easton, Pennsylvania, semipro baseball team that won the Pennsylvania state championship in 1874.  The Easton club's roster in 1874 also included Jim Devlin, George Bradley, John Abadie, Joe Battin and Bill Hague.  He also played for amateur and semipro ball clubs in the Philadelphia area both before and after playing for New Haven.

Later years
After retiring from baseball, he worked as a "segarmaker" and later as a roofer in Philadelphia.  He also served multiple sentences in the Philadelphia House of Correction for "drinking-related offenses."  He died in Philadelphia in 1888 at approximately age 35.  The cause of death was listed as uremia.  He was buried at the Old Cathedral Cemetery in Philadelphia.

References

Major League Baseball catchers
New Haven Elm Citys players
19th-century baseball players
Baseball players from Pennsylvania
1853 births
1888 deaths